Karl Köther (born 1 January 1942) is a German former cyclist. He competed in the sprint and 1000m time trial events at the 1972 Summer Olympics. His father, also named Karl Köther, competed at the 1928 Summer Olympics.

References

External links
 

1942 births
Living people
West German male cyclists
Olympic cyclists of West Germany
Cyclists at the 1972 Summer Olympics
Sportspeople from Hanover
Cyclists from Lower Saxony